John Moore-Stevens was a Church of England priest, most notably Archdeacon of Exeter from 1820 until his death on 30 March 1865.

He was born in 1782 at Great Torrington, educated at Exeter College, Oxford, and held incumbencies in Langtree and Otterton.

References

1782 births
1865 deaths
19th-century English Anglican priests
Alumni of Exeter College, Oxford
Archdeacons of Exeter
People from Great Torrington